is a Japanese media mix franchise by Sunrise, Pony Canyon, and Broccoli. A PlayStation Vita game was released on September 21, 2016, a manga series began serialization in the November 2016 issue of Sylph, which began serialization on September 22, 2016, and an anime television series produced by Sunrise began airing on October 2, 2016 and ended on December 25, 2016.

Characters

Main characters

 (anime)
The protagonist of the series. A second year student who wanted to transfer to Hoshigei High to be like her mother, Sakura Aigasaki. She is kind, friendly, and an amateur in making ikebana flower arrangements, but is working hard.

 (child)
A result-oriented, stoic singer who is a second year student. He is known as the "King" with the top singing skills in the school. He acts cool, but underneath his façade, he carries a passionate heart. He is under pressure from his father and his two older brothers to live up to the noble Ichijoji family name. He is childhood friends with Aoi, but at Hoshigei High, they are rivals fighting for the top spot. In episode 1, he declares Kohana as his rival due to their families' history, but as the story progresses, his feelings change.

An aloof calligrapher who goes his own way. He is a second year student who slouches, rarely talks, and is a genius in his own world. He is usually indifferent towards other people and the finer details, but once he becomes interested in something, he will become completely absorbed in it. He is childhood friends with Teika, but they are rivals fighting for the top spot at school.

 (child)
A handsome sculptor who makes everyone around him happy. He is a third year student who is cheerful, energetic and attentive, and popular with his classmates. Despite his small size frame, he is able to make giant sculptures with a chainsaw or chisel. His hobby is cooking. He respects and looks up to his grandfather, a master sculptor. He looks after Monet, his younger cousin whom he bakes sweets for.

 (child)
A sexy dancer who loves to flirt. He is a third year student who is indiscriminately kind to everyone and puts those around him in a good mood. He is always making jokes, but he hides his anguished feelings. He hardly ever takes things seriously and has dancing abilities that captivate anyone that watches.

An up-and-coming painter full of wisdom. A confident and slightly cheeky first year student, he is shy and sensitive to the words of others, but once he's opened his heart to someone, he gets needy. He is known as the "Monochrome Prince" for his monochrome paintings. Although he is still a student, his paintings are highly regarded. He has an older twin brother who is also a painter. He is Rintaro's cousin and has a pet hedgehog named Rin.

A kind-hearted cellist who is accepting of everyone. He is friendly and can't leave those in need alone. He is a first year student, an athlete, and he loves basketball. He is the oldest among the five of his siblings. His music has a warm tone to it.

Supporting characters

A second year student who is Kohana's roommate and friend. She is an actress and also writes plays.

 A teacher at Hoshigei High. He is the teacher of Kohana, Juri, Teika, and Aoi's class. When he was a student at Hoshigei, he participated in the Art Session with Sakura Aigasaki and Masana Ichijoji.

 (game)
 Monet's twin brother who is also a painter.

 (game)

 Teika's older brother. When he was a student at Hoshigei, he participated in the Art Session with Sakura Aigasaki and Chieri Todo. He is a trustee of the school.

 (anime)
 Teika's older brother. He is a trustee of the school.

 (anime)
 Kohana's mother who specialized in ikebana flower arranging and died in an accident when Kohana was a child.
Academy Principal
 (anime)
 Although a name has never been given or mentioned, he is the principal of the Hoshigei Academy. He is solely responsible for picking the members of the Hoshigei Festival Committee. He also is responsible for choosing who comes into, stays, and/or leaves the Hoshigel Academy.

Media

Video game
A Cero C PlayStation Vita game was released on September 21, 2016. The game was developed by HuneX and produced by Broccoli. In the game, the player takes the role of Kohana Aigasaki, whose name can be changed. The game features full voiced characters except for Kohana. The opening theme for the game is titled "Magical Flower" and is sung by Yūichirō Umehara, KENN, Yūki Ono, Wataru Hatano, Shouta Aoi, and Takuya Eguchi under the name ArtiSTARs.

Anime
A 13-episode anime television series produced by Sunrise began airing on October 2, 2016 on Tokyo MX, Sun TV, KBS Kyoto, TV Aichi, and BS11. The anime is directed by Mitsue Yamazaki with an original concept by Sunrise's Hajime Yatate. Kairi Yura serves as the original character design with Kumi Ishii adapting the designs for the anime. The opening theme is titled  and the ending song is titled "Please kiss my heart". Both songs are sung by ArtiSTARs. Crunchyroll holds the rights to stream the anime.

Episode list

Manga
A manga written by Hajime Yatate and drawn by Junta Mio began serialization in the November 2016 issue of Sylph. A gag, 4-koma manga version of series, titled  is serialized online for free at Ponimaga official website and is drawn by ImoUto.

Notes

References

External links
 
Official game website 

Anime with original screenplays
Bandai Namco franchises
GungHo Online Entertainment franchises
Male harem anime and manga
Ikebana
Sunrise (company)
2016 anime television series debuts
HuneX games
Broccoli (company) games